The 11th Panzergrenadier Division (11. Panzergrenadierdivision) was a West German mechanized infantry formation. It was part of the I Corps of the Bundeswehr. I Corps was part of NATO's Northern Army Group (NORTHAG), along with the I Belgian Corps, I British Corps, and the I Netherlands Corps. In the wake of military restructuring brought about by the end of the Cold War, the 11th Panzergrenadier Division was disbanded in 1994.

The division was constituted in May 1959 as part of the I Corps of the Bundeswehr. At that time, it commanded the 32nd Panzergrenadier and 33rd Panzer Brigades. In 1961, the 31st Panzergrenadier Brigade was also subordinated to the division. Division headquarters was quartered at Oldenburg.

The division provided assistance to civilians during the North Sea flood of 1962 and helped fight wildfires on the Luneberg Heath in summer 1975. In September 1990, elements of the division assisted with the removal of old U.S. chemical munitions during Operation Steel Box, including medics from Leer (Ostfriesland) who were at Nordenham for a few weeks.  From November 1990 to July 1991, elements of the division provided security, maintenance, and transport in the ports of Emden and Nordenham for U.S. and British troops redeploying to the Gulf War. The 11th Panzergrenadier Division was disbanded in 1994.

Commanders

References

 John Keegan, World Armies, New York: Facts on File, 1979, .

External links 
 Geschichte der Division auf www.relikte.com
 Information zu Division auf der Website Oldenburgs

Military units and formations established in 1959
Military units and formations disestablished in 1994
Mechanized divisions of the German Army